Richard Bennet(t) may refer to:

Academia
 Richard Bennett (historian) (1860–1937), Welsh Calvinistic Methodist historian whose addresses were published in Cyfrol Goffa Richard Bennett (1940)
 Richard E. Bennett (born 1946), religion professor

Entertainment
 Rick Bennett (voice actor) (19??–2019), actor and voice actor known for voicing Juggernaut and other movies
 Richard Bennett (actor) (1870–1944), film star and father of actresses Constance Bennett and Joan Bennett
 Richard Bennett Lamas (born 1968), Uruguayan former comic book artist

Music
 Richard Bennett (guitarist) (born 1951), Nashville based musician and record producer
 Richard Rodney Bennett (1936–2012), British composer

Politics
 Richard Bennett (governor) (1609–1675), colonial governor of Virginia
 Richard Bennet (MP for Wycombe) (14th cent), Member of Parliament for Wycombe
 Richard A. Bennett (born 1963), politician from Maine
 R. B. Bennett (1870–1947), prime minister of Canada
 Richard D. Bennett (born 1947), U.S. federal judge
 Richard Bennett (Mississippi politician) (born 1957), member of the Mississippi House of Representatives
 Richard Henry Alexander Bennet (senior) (1743–1814), British landowner and MP for Newport
 Richard Henry Alexander Bennet (junior) (1771?–1818), Royal Navy captain; MP for Launceston and Enniskillen

Sports
 Richard Bennett (Australian cricketer) (born 1965), Australian cricketer
 Richard Bennett (English cricketer) (1872–1953), English cricketer
 Richard Bennett (New Zealand cricketer) (born 1954), New Zealand cricketer
 Richard Bennett (sailor) (born 1932), Trinidad and Tobago sailor
 Dick Bennett (born 1943), basketball coach
 Rick Bennett (born 1967), retired American ice hockey left winger
 Richie Bennett (born 1991), English footballer

See also
 Bennett (disambiguation)